The 1993 Philadelphia Eagles season was their 61st in the National Football League (NFL). The team failed to improve upon their previous output of 11–5, winning only eight games and failed to qualify for the playoffs for only the second time in six seasons. Ten of their sixteen games were decided by a touchdown or less. The team was without future hall of fame defensive end Reggie White, who had signed via free agency with the Green Bay Packers.

The downturn was directly related to the twin losses of QB Randall Cunningham (broken leg) and WR Fred Barnett (ACL tear) to season-ending injuries in a 35–30 win against the New York Jets on October 3. Though the Eagles won their first four, following that game, lost six straight to fall out of playoff contention. Bubby Brister was only able to do so much in a starting role, but the club rallied to win their final three games, including their first road win in San Francisco in 10 years.

Offseason 
The Eagles held training camp at West Chester University of Pennsylvania for the 14th consecutive year.

NFL draft 

The 1993 NFL draft was held April 25–26, 1993. The draft was reduced to eight rounds, down from 12. Because the Eagles tied with five other teams at 11–5 in 1992, they rotated in picking 20th to 25th in the eight rounds. There were 224 players taken in this draft by the NFL. The Eagles had two first round picks at number 19 and 24 overall. With those, they chose Lester Holmes, an offensive tackle out of Jackson State, and Leonard Renfro, a defensive tackle out of Colorado.

Personnel

Staff

Roster

Schedule

Game summaries

Week 1

Week 2 
The Eagles spoiled Reggie White's Lambeau Field debut as a member of the Packers. White carved out a Hall of Fame career in eight seasons (1985-92) with the Eagles before signing with Green Bay as a free agent in April 1993.

Week 3

Week 5 
The victory was costly for the Eagles when Randall Cunningham went down with a season-ending injury, the second time in three seasons Philadelphia would have to play the majority of a campaign without its offensive leader.

Week 6

Week 7

Week 9

Week 10 
The Eagles suffered their first loss at Sun Devil Stadium after five consecutive victories.

Week 11 
Miami's Don Shula became the NFL's all-time leader in coaching victories with his 326th, surpassing the Chicago Bears' legendary George Halas. The winning quarterback was future Eagles coach Doug Pederson, substituting for the injured Scott Mitchell. Mitchell became the Dolphins' starter when Dan Marino suffered a season-ending injury in week 6.

Week 12 
The Giants earned their first win at Veterans Stadium since 1987.

Week 13

Week 14

Week 15

Week 16

Week 17 
The Saints, who began the season 5–0, saw their slim playoff hopes extinguished.

Week 18

Standings

References

External links 
 1993 Philadelphia Eagles at Pro-Football-Reference.com

Philadelphia Eagles seasons
Philadelphia Eagles
Philadelphia Eagles